

Mirror Blue is the eighth studio album by Richard Thompson, released in 1994.

The follow-up to 1991's successful Rumor And Sigh was recorded in January 1993 with Mitchell Froom once again in the producer’s chair. Despite the increase in sales for his previous two albums, Mirror Blue was held back. The delay was partly due to changes at the top at Capitol Records which saw long time Thompson fan and supporter Hale Milgrim being replaced by Gary Gersh.

When the album was eventually released it did not enjoy the record company support given to Thompson’s previous releases on Capitol.

Unusually for a new Thompson release, Mirror Blue was not given a warm welcome by the critics. Criticism of the album was centered on the controversial production rather than on Thompson’s songs and playing, both of which are strong on this album.

Thompson: "I thought it was a sort of deconstruction of the rock rhythm section... It was a radical record – and a brave record – it was off the back of the records Mitchell had done with Suzanne Vega and Los Lobos and the couple of records [engineer] Tchad Blake had done with Tom Waits. All of which I thought were terrific records and they all had a kind of character to them – a sound that was really trying to strip away some clichés, like why have a snare drum, why the backbeat? And just looking at the song and seeing what does the song need, what’s going to work?"

The critics did not agree, and the album was slammed for its unusual percussion and its lack of reverb. The charge was that the heavy-handed production drowned the songs. Mitchell Froom was cast as the villain of the piece, but Thompson seems to have been at least in favour of the production and quite probably a willing participant.

Despite the critical backlash and the poor sales, some of the songs on the album have become concert staples and favourites of Thompson’s fans. In particular "Beeswing" – a tale about a travelling girl and the prices that she and the young man who falls in love with her pay for the choices they make – has come to be regarded as one of Thompson’s very best compositions. Songs such as "Mingus Eyes", "Easy There, Steady Now" and "I Ride In Your Slipstream" have a jazzy feel and impressionistic lyrics, showing that whatever else he was doing Thompson was continuing to extend his artistic range.

On March 10, 2009, "The Way That It Shows" was released as a downloadable song for the video game Rock Band 2.

Guitar World placed Mirror Blue at number 40 in their "Superunknown: 50 Iconic Albums That Defined 1994" list.

Track listing
All songs written by Richard Thompson.

"For the Sake of Mary" – 4:19
"I Can’t Wake Up to Save my Life" – 3:11
"MGB-GT" – 3:35
"The Way That it Shows" – 6:08
"Easy There, Steady Now" – 4:43
"King of Bohemia" – 3:42
"Shane and Dixie" – 4:05
"Mingus Eyes" – 4:47
"I Ride in Your Slipstream" – 4:06
"Beeswing" – 5:30
"Fast Food" – 2:44
"Mascara Tears" – 3:36
"Taking my Business Elsewhere" – 4:28

Personnel
Richard Thompson – guitar, vocals, mandolin
Mitchell Froom – keyboards
Jerry Scheff – bass guitar, double bass
Pete Thomas – drums, percussion
Christine Collister – backing vocals
Michael Parker – backing vocals
John Kirkpatrick - accordion, concertinas
Danny Thompson - double bass on "Easy There, Steady Now"
Alistair Anderson - concertina, Northumbrian pipes
Tom McConville - fiddle
Martin Dunn - flute
Philip Pickett - shawms

References 

Richard Thompson - The Biography by Patrick Humphries. Schirmer Books. 
The Great Valerio by Dave Smith 
http://www.richardthompson-music.com/
 Rock band downloadable content

1994 albums
Richard Thompson (musician) albums
Albums produced by Mitchell Froom
Capitol Records albums